Tramin an der Weinstraße, often abbreviated to Tramin or Termeno, is a comune (municipality) in South Tyrol, northern Italy, located about  southwest of the city of Bolzano. The name of the grape variety Gewürztraminer has its origins in Tramin.

Geography

The municipality contains the frazioni (subdivisions, mainly villages and hamlets) Rungg (Ronchi) and Söll (Sella).

Tramin borders the following municipalities: Amblar, Kaltern, Coredo, Kurtatsch, Neumarkt, Montan, Auer, Sfruz and Vadena.

History

Coat of arms
The emblem represents a six points star of or surmounted by an or overturned crescent on azure background. The origin of the coat is not known but derives from that of Lords of Eppan. The arms were granted in 1929.

Society

Linguistic distribution
According to the 2011 census, 96.37% of the population speak German, 3.44% Italian and 0.20% Ladin as first language.

Demographic evolution

Twin cities
Tramin is twinned with:

 Rödermark, since 1978

 Mindelheim, since 1994

 Schwaz, since 1998

References

External links
 Homepage of the municipality
 Tourist Association of Tramin
Panoramio Photos of Tramin

Municipalities of South Tyrol
Nonsberg Group